Penstemon barnebyi is a species of penstemon known by the common names White River Valley beardtongue and Barneby's beardtongue. It is native to the mountain and basin territory of central western Nevada, where it grows in sagebrush and woodland; there is also one occurrence just over the California border. This is a hairy perennial herb with erect branches reaching  in maximum height. There are usually several located around the base of the plant. They are light purple with a purple-striped white throat lined with yellowish hairs. The protruding staminode is covered in bright orange hairs.

References

External links

barbatus
Flora of California
Flora of Nevada
Plants described in 1979
Flora of the United States
Flora without expected TNC conservation status